Manjari is the stage name of the Norwegian singer Trude Trefall.

Manjari is known for the song "Lys" (Lights), which she performed in the Norwegian finale for The Eurovision Song Contest in 1997.

External links
Absolutt Grand Prix vol. II

Living people
Melodi Grand Prix contestants
Year of birth missing (living people)
Place of birth missing (living people)
Norwegian women singers